Lion was a  74-gun third rate ship of the line of the French Navy, which later served in the Royal Navy. She was named Lion on 23 April 1790 and built at Rochefort from August 1791 until June 1794. She was renamed Marat on 28 September 1793 (7 months before being launched) and then Formidable on 25 May 1795, with the changing fortunes of the French Revolution.

She took part in the action of 6 November 1794, managing to rake .

Capture in the Battle of Groix
Fighting under captain Linois on 23 June 1795 at the Battle of Groix, she was captured by  near the French port of Lorient.

Battle of Trafalgar 1805

She was soon completely dismasted (the only British ship which suffered that fate), unable to manœuvre and largely unable to fight, as her sails blinded her batteries, but kept flying her flag for 45 minutes until the British ships behind her in the column came to her rescue. With 33 dead and 93 wounded, she was then towed to Gibraltar after the battle by the frigate .

Danish West Indies 1807
Following the concern in Britain that neutral Denmark was entering an alliance with Napoleon, the Belleisle sailed as the flagship of Rear-Admiral Alexander Cochrane, who commanded the squadron of ships that was sent to occupy the Danish West Indies. The squadron, which included HMS Prince George, HMS Northumberland, HMS Canada, HMS Ramillies and HMS Cerberus, captured Telemaco, Carvalho, and Master on 17 April 1807. The actual occupation of the Danish West Indies did not occur until December, after receipt of news of the second battle of Copenhagen.

Channel Fleet
From 1811 she was in Portsmouth harbour, and in 1814 the decision was taken to have her broken up.

References

External links
  « J’en ris encore », Nicolas Mioque

Ships of the line of the Royal Navy
Ships of the line of the French Navy
Téméraire-class ships of the line
1794 ships